Geoffrey I (Gauzfred I) (d. after 985), Viscount of Châteaudun, possibly the son of Geoffroy, Viscount of Chartres.  Geoffrey was appointed viscount by Theobald the Trickster, in his position of Count of Châteaudun. Geoffrey was the founder of the House of Châteaudun, which gave rise to both the House of Ingelger and House of Plantagenets.  It is believed, but unverified, that Geoffrey descended from Rorgon I, Count of Maine, and therefore part of the Rogonid/Rorgonid dynasty.
Little is known about Geoffrey, other than he was closely associated with Hardouin, Archbishop of Tours.

Geoffrey married Ermengarde of an unknown family and had one child:
 Hugues, Viscount of Châteaudun

Geoffrey was succeeded by his son as Viscount of Châteaudun upon his death.  There are differing accounts about Geoffrey and his offspring.  One prominent theory is that Geoffrey and Hughes were the same person, and that Ermengarde was Geoffrey’s first wife, and Hildegard, the wife of Hughes, was his second.

Sources 

Boussard, Jacques, L'origine des familles seigneuriales dans la région de la Loire moyenne, Cahiers de Civilisation Médiévale 5, 1962

Phalle, Édouard de Saint, Comtes de Troyes et de Poitiers au IXe siècle: histoire d’un double échec. In Christian Settipani and Katharine S. B. Keats-Rohan, Onomastique et Parenté dans l'Occident médiéval. 2000.

Kerrebrouck, Patrick van., Nouvelle histoire généalogique de l'auguste maison de France, vol. 1: La Préhistoire des Capétiens. 1993.

Tout, Thomas Frederick, The Empire and the Papacy: 918-1273, Periods of European History, London: Rivingtons, 1928

Medieval Lands Project, Vicomtes de Châteaudun

Medieval French nobility
10th-century French people
Viscounts of Châteaudun